Alejandro Alonso Gancedo (born 14 February 1999) is a Spanish field hockey player who plays as a defender for División de Honor club Tenis and the Spanish national team.

International career
Alonso made his debut for the senior national team in February 2021 in a FIH Pro League match against Belgium. On 25 May 2021, he was selected in the squad for the 2021 EuroHockey Championship, his first senior tournament. He also competed in the 2020 Summer Olympics. He made his World Cup debut at the 2023 Men's FIH Hockey World Cup.

References

External links

1999 births
Living people
Sportspeople from Santander, Spain
Field hockey players at the 2020 Summer Olympics
Spanish male field hockey players
Male field hockey defenders
Olympic field hockey players of Spain
División de Honor de Hockey Hierba players
2023 Men's FIH Hockey World Cup players